Kalyan is a city in the Thane district of Maharashtra, India.

Kalyan may also refer to:

Places
 Kalyan, Nepal, village Development Committee in mid-western Nepal
 Kalyan, Pakistan, village of Lahore District, Pakistan
 Kalyan, South Australia, a former town
 Kalyan taluka, administrative subdivision of Thana district, Maharashtra, India

People
 Kalyan (choreographer), Indian film choreographer
 Pawan Kalyan, Telugu cinema actor
 Kalyan Varma, Wildlife Filmmaker and photographer

Other
 Kalyan (Lok Sabha constituency), in Maharashtra, India
 Kalyan (thaat), in Hindustani music
 Kalyan Assembly constituency, a former constituency in Maharashtra, India
 Kalyan, a Hindi monthly published by Gita Press

See also
 Po-i-Kalyan, the Kalyan Minaret, located in Uzbekistan
 Kaliyan, Iran (disambiguation)
 Kalyanam (disambiguation)
 Kalyani (disambiguation)